Lewes is a constituency in East Sussex represented in the House of Commons of the UK Parliament since 2015 by Maria Caulfield, a Conservative.

Constituency profile
The constituency is centred on the town of Lewes. However, the constituency also covers most of the Lewes district, including the coastal towns of Seaford and Newhaven, which are rural and semi-rural and all in outer parts of the London Commuter Belt, though with a high number of people who have retired from across the country. The constituency excludes Peacehaven and Telscombe which since 1997 have been in Brighton, Kemptown, and includes part of neighbouring Wealden District.

Electoral Calculus categorises the constituency as "Centrist", indicating average levels of education and wealth and moderate support for Brexit.

Boundaries  

1885–1918: The Borough of Brighton, the Sessional Divisions of Hove and Worthing, and parts of the Sessional Divisions of Lewes and Steyning.

1918–1950: The Borough of Lewes, the Urban Districts of Newhaven, Portslade-by-Sea, and Seaford, and the Rural Districts of Chailey, Newhaven, and Steyning East.

1950–1955: The Borough of Lewes, the Urban Districts of Burgess Hill, Newhaven, and Seaford, the Rural District of Chailey, and parts of the Rural Districts of Cuckfield and Hailsham.

1955–1974: The Borough of Lewes, the Urban Districts of Burgess Hill, Newhaven, and Seaford, the Rural District of Chailey, and part of the Rural District of Cuckfield.

1974–1983: The Borough of Lewes, the Urban Districts of Newhaven and Seaford, the Rural District of Chailey, and part of the Rural District of Hailsham.

1983–1997: The District of Lewes, and the District of Wealden wards of Alfriston, Arlington, and East Dean.

1997–2010: The District of Lewes wards of Barcombe, Chailey, Ditchling, Hamsey, Kingston, Lewes Bridge, Lewes Castle, Lewes Priory, Newhaven Denton, Newhaven Meeching, Newhaven Valley, Newick, Ouse Valley, Plumpton, Ringmer, Seaford Central, Seaford East, Seaford North, Seaford West, and Wivelsfield.

2010–present: The District of Lewes wards of Barcombe and Hamsey, Chailey and Wivelsfield, Ditchling and Westmeston, Kingston, Lewes Bridge, Lewes Castle, Lewes Priory, Newhaven Denton and Meeching, Newhaven Valley, Newick, Ouse Valley and Ringmer, Plumpton, Streat, East Chiltington and St John Without, Seaford Central, Seaford East, Seaford North, Seaford South, and Seaford West.
With the District of Wealden wards of Alfriston, Arlington, East Dean, Polegate North, and Polegate South

History 
The constituency of Lewes has existed since commoners were first summoned to Parliament in 1295, the Model Parliament.  This is the county town, though less significant in population today, far surpassed by the City of Brighton and Hove — it has nonetheless been continuously represented since that date.

From 1874 the constituency's electorate in elections sent only Conservative MPs except between 1997 and 2015.

Members of Parliament

MPs 1295–1660 
 Constituency created 1295

MPs 1660–1868

MPs since 1868

Elections since 1918

Elections in the 2010s

Elections in the 2000s

Elections in the 1990s 

This constituency underwent boundary changes between the 1992 and 1997 general elections and thus change in share of vote is based on a notional calculation.

Elections in the 1980s

Elections in the 1970s 

New constituency boundaries.

Elections in the 1960s

Elections in the 1950s

Election in the 1940s

Elections in the 1930s

Elections in the 1920s

Elections in the 1910s

Election results 1868–1918

Elections in the 1860s

Elections in the 1870s

Elections in the 1880s

Elections in the 1890s

Elections in the 1900s

Elections in the 1910s 

General Election 1914/15:

Another General Election was required to take place before the end of 1915. The political parties had been making preparations for an election to take place and by July 1914, the following candidates had been selected;
Unionist: William Campion
Liberal:

Election results 1832–1868

Elections in the 1830s

Kemp resigned, causing a by-election.

Elections in the 1840s
Blunt's death caused a by-election.

 
 

On petition, Harford was unseated, due to bribery and corruption, and Fitzroy was declared elected on 21 March 1842. Fitzroy was then appointed a Civil Lord of the Admiralty, requiring a by-election.

 

Elphinstone resigned by accepting the office of Steward of the Chiltern Hundreds, causing a by-election.

Elections in the 1850s

 

Brand was appointed a Lord Commissioner of the Treasury, requiring a by-election.

 

 

 

FitzRoy was appointed First Commissioner of Works and Public Buildings, requiring a by-election.

Elections in the 1860s
FitzRoy's death caused a by-election.

Elections before 1832

See also 
List of parliamentary constituencies in East Sussex

Notes

References

Sources 
The Parliamentary History of the Borough of Lewes 1295–1885
Election result, 2005 (BBC)
Election results, 1997–2001 (BBC)
Election results, 1997–2001 (Election Demon)
Election results, 1983–1992 (Election Demon)
Election results, 1992–2005 (Guardian)
Election results, 1951–2001 (Keele University)
F. W. S. Craig. British Parliamentary Election Results 1950–1973.

Lewes
Parliamentary constituencies in South East England
Politics of East Sussex
Politics of Wealden District
Constituencies of the Parliament of the United Kingdom established in 1295